Raushan Ali is a Bangladesh Awami League politician and the former Member of Parliament of Jessore-3.

Career
Ali was elected to parliament from (now defunct) Jessore-9 as a Bangladesh Awami League candidate in 1973. He was elected again in 1991 from Jessore-3.

References

Awami League politicians
Living people
5th Jatiya Sangsad members
Year of birth missing (living people)
Bangladesh Krishak Sramik Awami League central committee members